Frits Janssens (14 March 1892 – 30 March 1965) was a Belgian wrestler. He competed at the 1920, 1924 and 1928 Summer Olympics.

References

External links
 

1892 births
1965 deaths
Olympic wrestlers of Belgium
Wrestlers at the 1920 Summer Olympics
Wrestlers at the 1924 Summer Olympics
Wrestlers at the 1928 Summer Olympics
Belgian male sport wrestlers
20th-century Belgian people